Louise Varèse (20 November 1890 – 1 July 1989), also credited as Louise Norton or Louise Norton-Varèse, was an American writer, editor, and translator of French literature who was involved with New York Dadaism.

Early life and education 

Varèse was born Louise McCutcheon in Pittsburgh, Pennsylvania, to John Lindsay McCutcheon and Mary Louise Taylor. She attended Smith College (class of 1912), but left in the fall of 1911 to marry Allen Norton.

Career 

Varèse founded and edited the modernist magazine Rogue (a play off of Vogue) with her then-husband, Allen Norton, from 1915 to 1916. She sometimes wrote under the pseudonym "Dame Rogue".  Under this pseudonym, Varèse wrote a fashion column called "Philosophic Fashions." She was also a contributor to the New York Dada magazine The Blind Man.

Varèse (then Norton) met Marcel Duchamp in 1915 and became close friends. She was involved in the 1917 Society of Independent Artists submission of a urinal under the name R.Mutt known as Fountain. She wrote a defense of the work titled "Buddha of the Bathroom" in issue 2 of The Blind Man.

Her address also appears on the label of Fountain as seen in the Alfred Stieglitz photograph of the work and her phone number was given as an alternative to Duchamp's as press contact. As such, she is a likely candidate for the "female friend" Duchamp mentions in a letter dated 11 April 1917 to his sister Suzanne: "Une de mes amies sous un pseudonyme masculin, Richard Mutt, avait envoyé une pissotière en porcelaine comme sculpture" ("One of my female friends under a masculine pseudonym, Richard Mutt, sent in a porcelain urinal as a sculpture.").

Varèse translated poetry and other works by Charles Baudelaire, Julien Gracq, Saint-John Perse, Marcel Proust, Arthur Rimbaud, Georges Simenon, and Stendhal. Her translations of the work of Arthur Rimbaud for James Laughlin's New Directions imprint were particularly influential. In 1956, she translated the section "The Great Improvisation" from Adam Mickiewicz's poetic drama Dziady.

She played an important role in the International Composers' Guild, and included material about this organisation in her book Varèse; a looking-glass diary (1972).

She was also a contributing writer for Lapham's Quarterly. In 1972, she wrote a biography of her late second husband, Edgard Varèse, titled: Varèse: A Looking-Glass Diary. For the exhibition Marcel Duchamp at the Philadelphia Museum of Art in 1973, Varèse wrote an essay titled Marcel Duchamp at Play.

Personal life 
Her first husband was poet and literary editor Allen Norton, the couple had a son, Michael in 1912, separated in 1916, and divorced in 1920. Louise also had a granddaughter, Sylvia Calderwood.

In 1922 she married composer Edgard Varèse; they remained together until his death in 1965.

Death 
Varèse died on July 1, 1989 at the age of 98 in Eugene, Oregon.

Awards 
In 1948, Varèse was awarded the Denyse Clairouin Award for her translation of Paris Spleen by Baudelaire.
She was awarded the Chevalier de l'Ordre des Arts et des Lettres in 1969.
Varèse was awarded MacDowell fellowships from 1967 through 1975.

Bibliography

Fiction
 Norton, Louise. Little wax candle; a farce in one act. New York: Claire Marie, 1914.

Nonfiction

 Norton [Varèse], Louise. "Buddha of the Bathroom," The Blind Man 2. May 1917: 5–6.
 Varèse, Louise. Varèse; a looking-glass diary. New York: W. W. Norton & Company, Inc., 1972. 
 [Norton] Varèse. Louise. "Marcel Duchamp at Play," in Marcel Duchamp, ed. Anne d'Harnoncourt and Kynaston McShine. New York: Museum of Modern Art; Philadelphia: Philadelphia Museum of Art. 1973; rpt. 1989. 224–225.

Translations

 Saint-John Perse, Éloges and Other Poems, W. W. Norton & Company, 1944. 
 Arthur Rimbaud, A Season in Hell, New Directions, 1945.
 Arthur Rimbaud, Illuminations, New Directions, 1946.
 Georges Bernanos, Joy, Pantheon Books, 1946.
 Jacques Lemarchand, Parenthesis, Alfred A. Knopf, 1947.
 Charles Baudelaire, Paris Spleen: 1869, New Directions, 1947.
 Marcel Proust, Pleasures and Regrets, Crown Publishers, 1946.
 Jean-Paul Sartre, The Chips are Down, Lear Publishers, 1948.
 Stendhal, The Green Huntsman, New Directions, 1950.
 Georges Bernanos, Joy, Pantheon, 1951.
 Georges Simenon, The Heart Of A Man, New American Library, 1951.
 Georges Simenon, The Girl in His Past, Prentice-Hall, 1952.
 Georges Simenon, I Take This Woman, Signet, 1953.
 Henri Michaux, Miserable Miracle (Mescaline), City Lights Books, 1956.

References

External links
 Louise Varèse papers at the Sophia Smith Collection, Smith College Special Collections

1890 births
1989 deaths
Writers from Pittsburgh
American translators
French–English translators
Translators of Marcel Proust
Dada
Chevaliers of the Ordre des Arts et des Lettres
MacDowell Colony fellows
20th-century translators